Adam Simon (born 1962) is a director and screenwriter.

Adam Simon may also refer to:

 Adam G. Simon (born 1977), actor and writer
 Ádám Simon (born 1990), Hungarian footballer

See also